Chilostoma cingulella is a species of medium-sized, air-breathing land snail, a terrestrial pulmonate gastropod mollusk in the family Helicidae, the true snails.

Distribution 
This species is found in Poland and Slovakia.

References

External links 
 http://www.mollbase.org/list/index.php?aktion=zeige_taxon&id=959
 http://www.animalbase.uni-goettingen.de/zooweb/servlet/AnimalBase/home/species?id=3183

Chilostoma
Gastropods described in 1837
Taxonomy articles created by Polbot
Taxobox binomials not recognized by IUCN